Campo de Lorenzo Airpark  is a 60 acre RV park and privately owned public-use dirt airstrip located 6 miles (9 km) south of San Quintín, Municipality of Ensenada, Baja California, Mexico, just on the shore of the Pacific Ocean in the Bahia de San Quintin. This airport is used solely for general aviation purposes.

External links
Campo de Lorenzo Skypark website

Airports in Baja California